
Gmina Gilowice is a rural gmina (administrative district) in Żywiec County, Silesian Voivodeship, in southern Poland. Its only other village having sołectwo status is Rychwałd.

Neighbouring gminas
Gmina Gilowice is bordered by the town of Żywiec and by the gminas of Łękawica, Ślemień and Świnna.

Twin towns – sister cities

Gmina Gilowice is twinned with:
 Uhrovec, Slovakia

References

Gilowice
Żywiec County